Aali is a surname. Notable people with the surname include:

 Jamiluddin Aali (1925–2015), Pakistani writer, critic, and scholar
 Ahmad Aali (born 1935), Iranian photographer and artist
 Mehmed Emin Âli Pasha (1815–1871), Ottoman statesman

Surnames of Hindustani origin